The Lester River, is a  tributary of Lake Superior, in northeastern Minnesota in the United States.

Course
The Lester River flows for its entire length in southern Saint Louis County.  It rises in Gnesen Township and flows generally southeastwardly through the city of Rice Lake and Lakewood Township, turning southward as it nears Lake Superior.  It flows into the lake in eastern Duluth.

Lester River is known as Basaabikaa-ziibi in Ojibwe, meaning "Rocky Canyon River", though Joseph Gilfillan translated its name as "River that comes through a worn hollow place in the rock," as the river passes through a canyon between Lester Park, where Amity Creek joins the Lester River, and the mouth of the river.

History
Lester River bears the name of an early settler.

Historical structures
Along the Lester River are two properties listed on the National Register of Historic Places.  They are:
 Lester River Bridge (Bridge No. 5772)
 US Fisheries Station, Duluth. Built in 1882, the complex is located at the mouth of the Lester River.  It is owned by the University of Minnesota Duluth and temporarily housed the Great Lakes Aquarium administrative offices at the beginning of the aquarium's operations.  The complex consists of the Hatchery/Bunk-room Building, Boat House, Pump House, Supervisor's Cabin on the south side of Congdon Boulevard, and a Superintendent's House on the north side of Congdon Boulevard. Between 2011 and 2013, it was given an extensive renovation.

Gallery

See also
List of rivers of Minnesota

References

Upham, Warren (2001). Minnesota place names: a geographical encyclopedia. St. Paul: Minnesota Historical Society Press. .
Waters, Thomas F. (1977).  The Streams and Rivers of Minnesota.  Minneapolis: University of Minnesota Press.  .

Geography of Duluth, Minnesota
Rivers of Minnesota
Rivers of St. Louis County, Minnesota
Tributaries of Lake Superior
Northern Minnesota trout streams